Rehe may refer to:

Rehe Province, former province in China
Rehe, Germany, community in Rhineland-Palatinate, Germany
Stephanie Rehe (born 1969), American professional tennis player